Galina Leonidovna Brezhneva (18 April 1929 – 30 June 1998) was the daughter of Soviet politician and longtime General Secretary Leonid Brezhnev and Viktoria Brezhneva.

Life and death
Galina Brezhneva was born on 18 April 1929 in Sverdlovsk. As a teenager, she refused to become a member of the Komsomol; later, she refused to study for an academic degree. She married for the first time to circus artist Yevgeny Timofeyevich Milaev (1910–1983) in 1951. He had twin children, Alexander "Sasha" and Natalya "Natasha" (born 1948) from his first marriage to Natalya Yurchenko who died from blood poisoning during childbirth. They had one daughter, Viktoria Yevgenyevna Milaeva (1952–2018). She was married briefly to Igor Kio, a union that lasted only nine days. By 1971, her father Leonid Brezhnev had become displeased with the way things were going in Galina's life. He wanted to arrange a marriage for her, after having her second marriage annulled. She ended up selecting Yuri Churbanov from a number of suitors. Churbanov was chosen even though he was already married and had children. By the end of Brezhnev's life, Galina was much less visible, and during the leadership of Yuri Andropov, she disappeared from the public eye altogether. Brezhneva made a public comeback during Konstantin Chernenko's short rule, and appeared in a conference commemorating International Women's Day. At the conference, she wore only one piece of jewelry, the Order of Lenin that she had been awarded by Andrei Gromyko in 1978 for her fiftieth birthday.  

Later, after Churbanov had been arrested on charges of corruption, Brezhneva divorced him. She married for a fourth and final time at the age of 64, to a 29-year-old man. Before her death, Brezhneva was a guest on British television to talk about life in the USSR. In her later life, Brezhneva gradually became a heavy drinker, and her daughter placed her in a psychiatric hospital where she died on 30 June 1998, aged 69.

Personal life and rumors
Historian Larisa Vasil'eva wrote in her book that "Galina Brezhneva was an all-too-typical product of what came to be known as the Era of Stagnation". Brezhneva was a heavy drinker and was known to be heavy-tempered. She had little self-discipline, and had a seemingly natural tendency toward self-gratification. She was known for her passion for jewellery and diamonds. Why and how Brezhneva received her diamonds was unknown to the majority at the time, though according to a former director of Yuvelirtorg, the state-run jewellery company in the USSR, all jewelry and valuables seized from criminals were given to members of the nomenklatura. Many rumors circulated in Soviet society about Brezhneva, most notably during Leonid Brezhnev's tenure as General Secretary; these rumors have been colloquially termed "diamond legends". In one such story, Brezhneva, during her visit to the Georgian SSR, visited a museum where she noticed two relics on display. She then demanded the two relics to be given to her as a gift. The museum director refused to comply and instead called the First Secretary of the Georgian Communist Party, Eduard Shevardnadze, to discuss the matter with General Secretary Brezhnev. Shevardnadze told Brezhnev that given her Georgian national heritage, her behaviour was unacceptable; Brezhnev agreed and ordered his daughter back to Moscow. Others stories included personal favors provided by Brezhneva to Soviet and other communist politicians, including Erich Honecker together with his wife Margot Honecker, Dimitri Ustinov, Wojciech Jaruzelski, Viktor Kulikov, Fidel Castro together with Raul Castro and Che Guevara, Sergei Gorshkov, Alexei Leonov, Jiang Qing, Todor Zhivkov, Le Duc Tho, Alexei Kosygin, Nikolai Tikhonov, Mengistu Haile Mariam, Egon Krenz, Vladimir Shatalov, Zhu De, Andrei Gromyko, Gustáv Husák, János Kádár, Heinz Hoffmann, Souphanouvong, Anatoly Dobrynin, Kim Jong-il, Erich Mielke, Ali Nasir Muhammad, Babrak Karmal, Nikolai Ogarkov, Yumjaagiin Tsedenbal, Markus Wolf, Samora Machel, Valentina Tereshkova, Daniel Ortega, Zhou En-lai, Pavel Kutakhov, Maurice Bishop, Jacqueline Creft, Willi Stoph, Nicolae Ceaușescu together with his wife Elena Ceaușescu, Lê Duẩn, Nikolay Krylov, Walter Ulbricht, Lin Biao, Pavel Batitsky, Hilde Benjamin, Vo Nguyen Giap and Gus Hall. 

Stories such as these greatly affected Leonid Brezhnev. He said once to a party colleague that "The world respects you, but your own family causes you pain". At the height of perestroika, a reform initiated by Mikhail Gorbachev, many of the rumours about Brezhneva became increasingly wild and questionable; new details and information, possibly apocryphal, were increasingly included in the rumours. In popular culture, these rumours helped depict the Brezhnev era as an "Era of Stagnation". Many of the rumours stemmed from the fact that most of Brezhneva's friends and colleagues had earlier been arrested, and the majority of them had been linked to some sort of corruption or vice.

Embezzlement
In January 1982, as part of Andropov's anti-corruption campaign while Leonid Brezhnev was still alive, several prominent jewellery smugglers who all had links with Brezhneva were arrested, some of them even receiving the death sentence. It was later proven that Brezhneva was smuggling jewellery out of the Soviet Union on such a scale as to threaten the business of De Beers Consolidated Mines, a group of companies focused on the mining of diamonds. Brezhneva was detained by the authorities, being summoned in one instance to the KGB headquarters for questioning. Her being the daughter of Leonid Brezhnev resulted in dismissal of the charges against her; she was, however, internally exiled by the Andropov administration. When Mikhail Gorbachev became General Secretary, the criminal investigations against Brezhneva and her brother, Yuri Brezhnev, were resumed. Her brother, a former First Deputy of the Ministry of Foreign Trade, and her husband, Yuri Churbanov, were both arrested on charges of corruption. However, investigators were never able to produce any solid charges against Brezhneva for her post-1982 criminal activities. In her later life, Brezhneva had become an alcoholic and usually signed statements without reading them properly.

References

Bibliography
 

1929 births
1998 deaths
Soviet women
Russian women
Galina Brezhneva
Children of national leaders
Daughters of national leaders
Recipients of the Order of Lenin
Recipients of the Order of the Red Banner of Labour
People from Yekaterinburg
Alcohol-related deaths in Russia